The superfamily Chrysidoidea is a very large cosmopolitan group (some 6,000 described species, and many more undescribed) , all of which are parasitoids or cleptoparasites of other insects. There are three large, common families (Bethylidae, Chrysididae, and Dryinidae) and four small, rare families (Embolemidae, Plumariidae, Sclerogibbidae, and Scolebythidae). Most species are small (7 mm or less), almost never exceeding 15 mm. This superfamily is traditionally considered to be the basal taxon within the Aculeata, and, as such, some species can sting, though the venom is harmless to humans.

Members of the families Dryinidae and Embolemidae are the only parasitoids among the Hymenoptera to have a life cycle in which the wasp larva begins its life inside the body of the host, and then later forms a sac (called a thylacium) that protrudes out of the host's abdomen. The closely related family Sclerogibbidae contains more traditional ectoparasitoids, attacking the nymphs of webspinners.

The extinct, monotypic family Plumalexiidae was described in 2011 from fossils preserved in Turonian age New Jersey amber.

References

External links
 Online identification guide to eastern North American Chrysididae wasps

 
Apocrita superfamilies
Late Cretaceous insects
Cenozoic insects
Turonian first appearances
Extant Barremian first appearances